Rende District is a rural district in southern Tainan, Taiwan.

History
After the handover of Taiwan from Japan to the Republic of China in 1945, Rende was organized as a rural township of Tainan County. On 25 December 2010, Tainan County was merged with Tainan City and Rende was upgraded to a district of the city.

Geography 
 Area: 50.77 km2
 Population: 76,983 people (January 2023)

Administrative divisions 
The district consists of Taizi, Tuku, Yijia, Rende, Renyi, Xintian, Houbi, Shanglun, Baoan, Chenggong, Renhe, Renai, Erhang, Dajia, Zhongzhou, Wenxian Village.

Education 
 Chia Nan University of Pharmacy and Science
 Chung Hwa University of Medical Technology

Hospitals 
 Chest Hospital
 Jianan Psychiatric Center

Tourist attractions 
 Chimei Museum
 Furniture Manufacturing Eco Museum in Tainan
 Hushan Park
 Taiwan Holocaust Museum

Transportation

Rail 
 Bao'an Station
 Rende Station
 Zhongzhou Station

Road 
 National Highway 1
 Provincial Highway 1
 Provincial Highway 86

References

External links 

  

Districts of Tainan